Dr. Arturo Umberto Illia  is an airport serving General Roca, a city in the Río Negro Province of Argentina. It is named after Arturo Umberto Illia, the 34th President of Argentina. There are no regular flights to or from the airport, .

See also

Transport in Argentina
List of airports in Argentina

References

External links
SkyVector - General Roca Airport

Airports in Argentina